Bethlehem Hungarian was an American soccer club based in Bethlehem, Pennsylvania that was a member of the American Soccer League.

After their first season the team moved to Allentown, Pennsylvania but folded early in the season.

Year-by-year

References

Defunct soccer clubs in Pennsylvania
American Soccer League (1933–1983) teams
Hungarian-American culture in Pennsylvania
1938 establishments in Pennsylvania
1939 disestablishments in Pennsylvania
Association football clubs established in 1938
Association football clubs disestablished in 1939